Ían de Jesús Arellano Lira (born July 2, 1997, in Monterrey, Nuevo León) is a Mexican professional footballer who last played for Venados.

He is the son of former Mexican football player Jesús Arellano.

References

1997 births
Living people
Association football midfielders
C.F. Monterrey players
FC Juárez footballers
Venados F.C. players
Ascenso MX players
Tercera División de México players
Footballers from Nuevo León
Sportspeople from Monterrey
Mexican footballers